Maples may refer to:

 Maple trees

People
 Chauncy Maples (1852–1895), British Anglican missionary and bishop in Africa
 Fred Calvin Maples (1910–1987), American Southern gospel singer 
 John Maples (cricketer) (1913–1958), English cricketer
 John Maples, Baron Maples (1943–2012), British politician
 Marla Maples (born 1963), American socialite
 Michael D. Maples (born 1949), American military officer and former director of the Defense Intelligence Agency
 William R. Maples (1937–1997), American anthropologist
 William Maples (cricketer) (1820–1854), English Imperial civil servant and cricketer

Places
 Maples (Middletown, Delaware), listed on the U.S. National Register of Historic Places in Delaware
 Maples, Indiana, a small town in the United States
 Maples, Missouri, an unincorporated community
 Maples Rest Area, a state park in Oregon

Schools
 Maples Collegiate, a public high school in Winnipeg, Manitoba

Other uses
 Maples baronets, a title in the Baronetage of England
 Maples Group (formerly Maples and Calder), an international law firm advising on the laws of the Cayman Islands, Ireland and the British Virgin Islands
 Maples Cottage, a historic cottage in Westborough, Massachusetts
 Maples Inn (disambiguation), various inns
 Maples Pavilion, an arena in Stanford, California
 Maples v. Thomas, a U.S. Supreme Court ruling
 Maple & Co. (also known as Maples), a London-based furniture retailer

See also
 Maple (disambiguation)
 The Maples (disambiguation)